Tergnier is a commune in the Aisne department in Hauts-de-France in northern France. Its location on the Canal de Saint-Quentin and the Creil–Jeumont railway (Tergnier station) supported its development as an industrial centre in the second half of the 19th century.

Politics and administration 

The commune of Tergnier absorbed the former communes of Fargniers and Vouël in 1973, and Quessy in 1991. Since the 2020 municipal elections, Michel Carreau has been the mayor of Tergnier.

Tergnier is twinned with the municipality of Wolfhagen (Germany) since 17 May 1981.

Population

The population data in the table and graph below refer to the commune of Tergnier proper, in its geography at the given years, i.e. excluding former communes that were absorbed at a later date.

See also
 Communes of the Aisne department

References

Communes of Aisne
Aisne communes articles needing translation from French Wikipedia